Warpaint is the eighth studio album by American hard rock band Buckcherry, released on March 8, 2019, by Century Media Records. It is their first and only album to feature guitarist Kevin Roentgen and drummer Sean Winchester.

Track listing

 * Japanese bonus tracks

Personnel
Josh Todd – vocals
Stevie D – guitars, backing vocals
Kelly LeMieux – bass, backing vocals
Kevin Roentgen – guitars, backing vocals
Sean Winchester – drums

Additional musicians
Igor Khoroshev – orchestration, strings

Recording personnel
Johnny Andrews – composer
Stevie Dacanay – composer
Hatsukazu "Hatch" Inagaki – engineering, mixing
Howie Weinberg – mastering
Mike Plotkinoff – mixing, producing
Trent Reznor – composer

Additional personnel
Aaron Marsh – art direction, layout design
Amy Mazer – assistant
Jeremy Staffer – photography

Charts

References

2019 albums
Buckcherry albums
Century Media Records albums